Oleksandr Safonov (born 17 December 1991) is a Ukrainian professional footballer who plays for Bischofshofen.

Career
He is the product of Youth Sportive Schools of FC Olimpik Kirovohrad and FC Ametyst Oleksandria.

Safonov played in the Ukrainian amateur and lower Leagues clubs and in February 2017 signed contract with Belarusian FC Slutsk.

References

External links 
 
 

1991 births
Living people
People from Znamianka
Sportspeople from Kirovohrad Oblast
Ukrainian footballers
Association football defenders
Ukrainian expatriate footballers
Expatriate footballers in Belarus
Expatriate footballers in Austria
Ukrainian expatriate sportspeople in Belarus
FC Oleksandriya players
MFC Mykolaiv players
FC Inhulets Petrove players
FC Cherkashchyna players
FC Slutsk players
FC Volyn Lutsk players
FC Kremin Kremenchuk players
FC LNZ Cherkasy players
SK Bischofshofen players
Ukrainian First League players
Ukrainian Second League players